Remote Control Productions GmbH (RCP; stylized in lowercase) is a Munich-based, independent games production house with a network of 14 development studios in Germany, Austria, Finland and Pakistan. It includes Chimera Entertainment, Stillalive Studios among others, having produced more than 350 projects such as Angry Birds Epic. The teams have shipped over 400 projects, including Premium and F2P games for Windows, Xbox, PlayStation, Switch, Mobile, VR and Web-based platforms since 2005.

History 

In 2005, the production house was founded as ML Enterprises GmbH under the leadership of Hendrik Lesser and Marc Möhring.
Remote Control Productions' focus lies on the support of developers, publishers, corporations and institutions for mediation, realisation and production of game projects, as well as financing, consulting, development and coaching of start-ups and studios from the games industry.

In 2006, Lesser founded the developer studio Chimera Entertainment along with Alexander Kehr and Christian Kluckner, which meanwhile became the biggest studio of the Remote Control Productions developer network with more than 40 employees.
In September 2008, ML Enterprises was renamed to Remote Control Productions. In the same year, Remote Control Productions and Chimera Entertainment produced their first own game project: the real-time strategy game Windchaser (Windows).

In the meantime, Remote Control Productions co-founded under the aggregation of the RCP developer family further studios such as Brightside Games (2010), Wolpertinger Games (2010), it Matters Games (2012) and expanded the developer merger for the studios TG Nord (2012), Stillalive Studios (2012) and Zeitland (2012).

Remote Control Productions also established with GamesInFlames an own publishing company in 2010. In late 2014, the subsidiary GAMIFY now! was founded, which is specialized in "gamification" and serious games. Austrian developers DoubleSmith and REDOX Game Labs and the Nuremberg-based developer studio NeoBird are part of the Remote Control Productions developer family since 2014 and 2015, respectively. In the beginning of 2016, Remote Control Productions opened an office in Kotka, Finland with Jyri Partanen as managing director.

Produced games 

From 2005 till 2007, Remote Control Productions supported Collision Studios' developer team during the development of the first-person shooter game Red Ocean, as well as the production of Legend: Hand of God with publisher dtp entertainment, and Crashday with publisher Atari Europe. In 2008, Remote Control Productions produced the real-time strategy game Windchaser (Windows) with Chimera Entertainment. In association with Bigpointe, Remote Control Productions and Chimera Entertainment developed the strategy game Warstory – Europe in Flames, a Microsoft Silverlight browser MMO that takes place in World War II.

Releases such as Coreplay's Ion Assault and Brightside Games' Zeit², as well as Chimera Entertainment's Happy Hills (iOS) and Demolition Dash followed in 2011. Remote Control Productions participated in the production of the first interactive audiobook, Audigent's Raumzeit Folge 1: Der verbotene Sektor. In 2012, several Chimera Entertainment productions followed – Mission: Genesis, Skylancer and Word Wonders, which has won the GCGA in the category "Best Mobile Game of the Year" in 2013.

Along with Stillalive Studios, Remote Control Productions completed a Kickstarter campaign for their game Son of Nor in May 2013, which released in April 2015. In June 2014, Remote Control Productions released the Angry Birds game Angry Birds Epic in co-production with developer Chimera Entertainment and partner Rovio Entertainment. The hidden object game Mystery of Neuschwanstein, developed by Chimera Entertainment and funded by the FilmFernsehFonds Bayern, followed in February 2015

References 

Companies based in Munich
Video game companies of Germany
Video game companies established in 2005
German companies established in 2005